Cyperus altsonii is a species of sedge that is native to northern South America.

The species was first formally described by the botanist Georg Kükenthal in 1932.

See also
 List of Cyperus species

References

altsonii
Plants described in 1932
Taxa named by Georg Kükenthal
Flora of French Guiana
Flora of Guyana
Flora of Peru
Flora of Suriname
Flora of Venezuela